The 1941 NAIA basketball tournament was held in March at Municipal Auditorium in Kansas City, Missouri. The 5th annual NAIA basketball tournament featured 32 teams playing in a single-elimination format. 

The third time was the charm for the San Diego State Aztecs. After losing the previous two years to Southwestern College and Tarkio College, the Aztecs finally won beating Murray State, 36–34.

It also was the first time that the tournament MVP was awarded to a player whose team did not win the championship, or make the NAIA Final Four (Charles Thomas played for Northwestern State which lost in the second round to Texas Wesleyan. San Diego State was the first team to make it to the championship game three times.

Awards and honors
Many of the records set by the 1941 tournament have been broken, and many of the awards were established much later:
Leading scorer est. 1963
Leading rebounder est. 1963
Charles Stevenson Hustle Award est. 1958
Coach of the Year est. 1954
Player of the Year est. 1994

Bracket

  * denotes overtime.

See also
 1941 NCAA basketball tournament
 1941 National Invitation Tournament

References

NAIA Men's Basketball Championship
Tournament
1941 in sports in Missouri